Four Seas Ice Cream is an independent ice cream shop located in Centerville, Massachusetts. It is one of the three oldest ice cream shops in New England. It has been the winner of many awards and citations over the years as the result of its flavors.  In the past, it has been voted number seven on the list of Top 10 Ice Cream Parlors in the United States.

History
The shop was founded in 1934 by a W. Wells Watson. The store was named from part of a poem by "Mable E. Phinney" - 'Cape Cod Calls'; '"We face four seas," our slogan runs  Four seas of azure blue...' The 4 seas refers to the 4 bodies of water surrounding the Cape: the Atlantic Ocean, Buzzards Bay, Cape Cod Bay, and Nantucket Sound. In 1960, the shop was purchased by Dick Warren and during this time the parlor was frequented by the Kennedy Family. The store was operated by Warren until 2001 when he sold it to his son and daughter-in-law - Douglas and Peggy Warren. Dick Warren—also known as "Chief" by his employees—continued to help out at the store until his death in 2008. He wrote the book "The Complete Idiot's Guide to Home Made Ice Cream." The shop has stayed in the same location over the past 86 years, and has even kept the same diner feel setup that it originated with. Over the years, the shop has garnered many national awards from many reputable organizations. In 2011, Food and Drink Magazine named the company number sixteen in their top 25 ice cream stories.

Awards
Cape Cod Life - Winner of Best Ice Cream Mid Cape
Boston Magazine - Best Ice Cream
Channel 7 News - New England's Best
USA Today Top Ten Ice Cream Places
Phantom Gourmet Approved
New England's Best
Food & Wine's Best Ice Cream Spots in the U.S.
The Real Paper Awards - Best Ice Cream
Yankee Travel New England Editors Pick

References

External links
Official website

Ice cream parlors in the United States
Buildings and structures in Barnstable, Massachusetts
Companies based in Barnstable, Massachusetts
Restaurants in Massachusetts
Restaurants established in 1934
1934 establishments in Massachusetts